Martin Edward Kreitman is an American geneticist at the University of Chicago, most well known for the McDonald–Kreitman test that is used to infer the amount of adaptive evolution in population genetic studies.

Education
Kreitman graduated from Stony Brook University with a Bachelor of Science degree Biology in 1975, and from the University of Florida with a Master of Science degree in Zoology, in 1977. He went on to study at Harvard University, graduating with a Ph.D. in Population Genetics, specifically Nucleotide Sequence Variation of Alcohol dehydrogenase in Drosophila melanogaster in 1983.

Research
The Kreitman lab does research in four main areas:

Awards and honors
1991 MacArthur Fellows Program
editor-in-chief of "Journal of Molecular Evolution" from 1999
 Section head of the "Evolutionary/Comparative Genetics" part of Faculty of 1000 biology 
2010 named fellow of the American Academy of Arts and Sciences

Recent publications

References

External links
"Martin Kreitman", Scientific Commons

American geneticists
University of Chicago faculty
Stony Brook University alumni
University of Florida College of Agricultural and Life Sciences alumni
Harvard University alumni
Fellows of the American Academy of Arts and Sciences
MacArthur Fellows
Living people
Year of birth missing (living people)